Diego Gutiérrez y Toledo (c. 1510 – December 1544) was the first governor of Nuevo Cartago y Costa Rica Province, established by the Crown of Castile within the Captaincy General of Guatemala in the Viceroyalty of New Spain. Named governor on 29 November 1540, he did not begin acting as such until late 1543 due to a series of difficulties. On 22 November 1543 he founded the village of Santiago in Costa Rica and on 4 October 1544 he founded the village of San Francisco, abandoning Santiago. In San Francisco he hosted several local chiefs, who he later held for ransom. One of the chiefs escaped and another one admitted not having valuables to offer. Consequently, Gutiérrez y Toledo subjected him to servitude, which prompted other indigenous groups to destroy the Spanish colony in retaliation. Gutiérrez y Toledo and the rest of the colonists then marched into the jungle, where they were killed by the natives.

Gutiérrez y Toledo was born in the village of Madrid, Crown of Castile, in 1510, to Alonso Gutiérrez de Madrid, royal treasurer, and María Rodríguez de Pisa, both judeoconversos. His brother Felipe Gutiérrez y Toledo (1500 – 1544) became the governor of Veragua.

References

1510 births
1544 deaths
Colonial Central America
People from Madrid